Markovec is a settlement east of Stari Trg in the Municipality of Loška Dolina in the Inner Carniola region of Slovenia.

Geography
Markovec includes the hamlets of Trzne to the west, and Podslavina and Koča Vas (in older sources Kača Vas) to the east. Koča Vas is centered around Hallerstein Manor.

Hallerstein Manor
Hallerstein Manor, also known as Koča Vas Manor, stands southeast of the village center of Markovec. It is a three-story rectangular Renaissance building with a central dormer above the entryway. The manor was built by the barons of Haller von Hallerstein in the second half of the 16th century. The building was remodeled in the Baroque style after a fire in 1674.

References

External links

Markovec on Geopedia

Populated places in the Municipality of Loška Dolina